Einar Torgersen (24 August 1886 – 9 September 1946) was a Norwegian sailor who competed in the 1920 Summer Olympics. He was a crew member of the Norwegian boat Marmi, which won the silver medal in the 6 metre class (1907 rating).

References

External links
profile at Sports-reference.com

1886 births
1946 deaths
Norwegian male sailors (sport)
Sailors at the 1920 Summer Olympics – 6 Metre
Olympic sailors of Norway
Olympic silver medalists for Norway
Medalists at the 1920 Summer Olympics
Olympic medalists in sailing